The 2012 European Junior Curling Challenge was held from January 3 to 8 at the Tårnby Curling Club in Copenhagen, Denmark. The challenge consisted of nations that have not already qualified for the World Junior Championships. The winners of the men's and women's tournaments qualified for the 2012 World Junior Curling Championships in Östersund, Sweden.

Men

Teams
The teams are listed as follows:

Round-robin standings
Final round-robin standings

Round-robin results
All draw times are listed in Central European Time (UTC+01).

Group A

Draw 1
Wednesday, January 4, 12:30

Draw 2
Wednesday, January 4, 19:30

Draw 3
Thursday, January 5, 12:30

Draw 4
Thursday, January 5, 19:30

Draw 5
Friday, January 6, 12:30

Draw 6
Friday, January 6, 19:30

Draw 7
Saturday, January 7, 12:30

Group B

Draw 1
Wednesday, January 4, 12:30

Draw 2
Wednesday, January 4, 19:30

Draw 3
Thursday, January 5, 12:30

Draw 4
Thursday, January 5, 19:30

Draw 5
Friday, January 6, 12:30

Draw 6
Friday, January 6, 19:30

Draw 7
Saturday, January 7, 12:30

Tiebreaker
Saturday, January 7, 19:30

Playoffs

Semifinals
Sunday, January 8, 10:00

Final
Sunday, January 8, 15:00

Women

Teams
The teams are listed as follows:

Round-robin standings
Final round-robin standings

Round-robin results
All draw times are listed in Central European Time (UTC+01).

Draw 1
Tuesday, January 3, 19:30

Draw 2
Wednesday, January 4, 9:00

Draw 3
Wednesday, January 4, 16:00

Draw 4
Thursday, January 5, 9:00

Draw 5
Thursday, January 5, 16:00

Draw 6
Friday, January 6, 9:00

Draw 7
Friday, January 6, 16:00

Draw 8
Saturday, January 7, 9:00

Draw 9
Saturday, January 7, 16:00

Playoffs

Semifinal
Sunday, January 8, 10:00

Final
Sunday, January 8, 15:00

References

External links

European Junior Challenge
European Junior Curling Challenge
European Junior Curling Challenge
International curling competitions hosted by Denmark